Israel-United States Memorandum may refer to:

 Israel-United States Memorandum of 1975
 Israel-United States Memorandum of 1979 - Signed as part of the Egypt–Israel peace treaty
 Israel-United States Memorandum of 1981